Sundberg is a Swedish surname (sund  meaning Healthy, strait (as in a strait of water)  berg meaning mountain).

Geographical distribution
As of 2014, 54.1% of all known bearers of the surname Sundberg were residents of Sweden (frequency 1:955), 30.4% of the United States (1:62,338), 6.9% of Finland (1:4,190), 2.9% of Norway (1:9,436), 1.9% of Canada (1:99,186) and 1.4% of Denmark (1:21,220).

In Sweden, the frequency of the surname was higher than national average (1:955) in the following counties:
 1. Västernorrland County (1:327)
 2. Gävleborg County (1:344)
 3. Norrbotten County (1:398)
 4. Jämtland County (1:475)
 5. Dalarna County (1:523)
 6. Västerbotten County (1:758)
 7. Stockholm County (1:854)
 8. Uppsala County (1:877)
 9. Gotland County (1:943)

In Finland, the frequency of the surname was higher than national average (1:4,190) in the following regions:
 1. Åland (1:211)
 2. Uusimaa (1:2,232)
 3. Ostrobothnia (1:2,759)
 4. Southwest Finland (1:3,104)
 5. Kymenlaakso (1:3,798)

People

 Alan C. Sundberg (1933-2002), American judge, Supreme Court of Florida (see: wiki/Alan_C._Sundberg
Andy Sundberg (1941–2012), advocate for American citizens abroad
Anne Sundberg, American documentary film-maker
Anton Niklas Sundberg (1818–1900), Swedish Lutheran archbishop of Uppsala, Sweden
Arnie Sundberg  (1906–1970), American weightlifter who competed in the 1932 Summer Olympics
Bertil Sundberg (1907–1979), Swedish chess player
Carl Sundberg, American football coach
Carl-Johan Sundberg, Swedish actor
Clayton A. Sundberg, Canadian Christian Heritage Party candidate from Alberta
Clinton Sundberg (1903-1987), American actor
H. Sundberg, zoologist and classifier of various day geckos (phelsumas) in the Seychelles Islands, awarded the sundbergi classification
Harry Sundberg, Swedish football/soccer player at the 1924 Paris Olympics
Ivan Sundberg, Circulation Director St. Paul Pioneer Press
Jacob W. F. Sundberg, president of the International Commission of Inquiry into the 1932–1933 Famine in Ukraine
Jim Sundberg, American  major-league baseball player and American League All-Star catcher and Gold Glove Award winner
Joe Sundberg, main vocalist for the late '60s rock band Fuse
Johan Sundberg, author of textbook The Science of Musical Sounds
Johanna Sundberg (1828-1910), ballerina
John Sundberg (1920-2004), Swedish sport shooter
Julius Sundberg (1887–1931), Finnish journalist and politician
Maud Sundberg (1911–2010), Swedish Olympic sprint runner
Niels Sundberg, owner of Sun Air of Scandinavia
Ola Sundberg, Swedish spokesperson for the Sweden Democrats party (Sverigedemokraterna)
Oliver Sundberg, Danish speedskater
Per B Sundberg, b. 1964 is a Swedish glass- and ceramic artist
Peter Sundberg,  Swedish car racing
Mark L. Sundberg, Behavior analyst, applied and research psychologist. Founder of Journal of Verbal Behavior
Richard J. Sundberg, co-author of textbook Advanced Organic Chemistry Part A Structure and Mechanisms
Ross Sundberg, Australian Federal Court judge
Ulrika Sundberg, Swedish diplomat

See also
 Phelsuma sundbergi – 3 subgenera of the Phelsuma day gecko from the Seychelles
Sundberg Guitars – Swedish company that produces handmade high-quality acoustic guitars
Olson Sundberg Kundig Allen Architects –  architectural firm based in Seattle, Washington

References

Swedish-language surnames